Fulton Peter Allem (born 15 September 1957) is a South African professional golfer.

Allem was born in Kroonstad, Orange Free State, South Africa, the middle child of five children and the grandson of a Lebanese trader; he had a privileged upbringing. By the time he came into the world, his family had the largest corn farm in the Southern Hemisphere and the only privately owned grain silos in South Africa.  Allem started playing golf at the age of 7 with encouragement from his father. Gary Player, a close family friend, also had a large influence on his early career.

Allem did not attend college and turned pro in 1976. He spent the early part of his career playing mostly in South Africa. He won 11 times on the Sunshine Tour between 1985 and 1991. A second-place finish in the 1987 NEC World Series of Golf convinced him to join the PGA Tour. Allem's first win on the PGA Tour was at the 1991 Independent Insurance Agent Open.

In 1993, he won twice on the PGA Tour and finished ninth on the money list. He won the Southwestern Bell Colonial and NEC World Series of Golf that year, two of the Tour's most prestigious non-majors.

Since his big year in 1993, Allem has been plagued by a host of medical ailments. In 1994, he suffered a herniated disc in his lower back. In 1998, he developed pericarditis, a potentially fatal inflammation of the sack surrounding the heart. In 2003, there were problems with vertebrae in his cervical spine. He has also suffered multiple heart attacks. These conditions have limited his playing time and adversely affected his play.

Allem lives in Central Florida with his wife, Jennifer and their four children. He is sometimes known by the nickname "Fulty", particularly by the other South African players. He has appeared on Fore Inventors Only on The Golf Channel. His youngest brother is the interior designer Charles Allem, Principal of CAD International based in Miami.

Allem began play on the Champions Tour in late 2007 after reaching the age of 50. He recorded three T2 finishes during his first two full seasons.

Professional wins (15)

PGA Tour wins (3)

Sunshine Tour wins (11)
1986 Minolta Match Play Championship, AECI Charity Classic, Palabora Classic
1987 Palabora Classic, Lexington PGA Championship
1988 Palabora Classic
1989 Minolta Match Play Championship
1990 Lexington PGA Championship, Twee Jonge Gezellen Masters, Goodyear Classic
1991 ICL International

Other wins (1)

Results in major championships

CUT = missed the half-way cut
"T" = tied

Results in The Players Championship

CUT = missed the halfway cut
"T" indicates a tie for a place

Results in senior major championships

CUT = missed the halfway cut
"T" indicates a tie for a place

Team appearances
This list may be incomplete.
Dunhill Cup (representing South Africa): 1993
Presidents Cup (International team): 1994
Alfred Dunhill Challenge (representing Southern Africa): 1995 (winners)

References

External links

South African male golfers
Sunshine Tour golfers
PGA Tour golfers
PGA Tour Champions golfers
South African expatriates in the United States
South African people of British descent
South African people of Lebanese descent
Sportspeople of Lebanese descent
People from Kroonstad
1957 births
Living people